is a former Japanese football player.

Takahashi previously played for Mito Hollyhock in the J2 League.

Club statistics

References

External links

1985 births
Living people
Chukyo University alumni
Association football people from Ibaraki Prefecture
Japanese footballers
J2 League players
Japan Football League players
Mito HollyHock players
MIO Biwako Shiga players
Association football forwards